
Year 349 BC was a year of the pre-Julian Roman calendar. At the time it was known as the Year of the Consulship of Camillus and Crassus (or, less frequently, year 405 Ab urbe condita). The denomination 349 BC for this year has been used since the early medieval period, when the Anno Domini calendar era became the prevalent method in Europe for naming years.

Events 
 By place 

 Persian Empire 
 Sidon is besieged by Persian forces.

 Macedonia 
 After recovering from illness, Philip II of Macedon turns his attention to the remaining Athenian controlled cities in Macedonia and to the city of Olynthus, in particular. The Athenians organise to send help.

Births

Deaths

References